La Libertad is a town and one of the 119 municipalities of Chiapas, in southern Mexico.

As of 2010, the municipality had a total population of 4,974, down from 5,288 as of 2005. It covers an area of 1,964.90 km² and is adjacent to the municipality of Palenque and the state of Tabasco.

As of 2010, the town of La Libertad had a population of 2,032. Other than the town of La Libertad, the municipality had 94 localities, none of which had a population over 1,000.

References

Municipalities of Chiapas